Lady Killer is a 1995 drama film directed by Steven Schachter, and stars Judith Light as a married woman who breaks off an affair with a younger man, Jack Wagner, who doesn't react well and targets her daughter, Tracey Gold.

Plot
Janice Mitchell (Judith Light) is a married woman who has a brief affair with an attractive, younger man Dr. Guy Ellisman (Jack Wagner). When she breaks off the affair, he doesn't react well, first by stalking and raping her.

Janice and her husband decide to take an island vacation with their daughter Sharon (Tracey Gold), who brings along her boyfriend, who turns out to be Guy Ellisman. Janice soon finds herself at risk of telling her family about her affair.

In the end, everything comes to a head at a lighthouse, when Guy attempts to kill Ross by shooting him, then chases Janice up to the top of the lighthouse, trying to claim that Ross died in an accidental shooting and that they can finally be together, and tries to rape her again. Sharon, having discovered Guy's true nature, attempts to stop him by taking his gun and revealing to Janice that Guy shot Ross on purpose, causing Guy to attack her, throw the gun away, and violently push her down to the ground. Having now been exposed for attempting to kill Ross in front of Janice, Guy begs Janice to not hate him, only for Janice to angrily push him off the lighthouse tower, sending a screaming Guy falling to his death. Janice and Sharon then reach Ross, who is still alive, and the reunited family wait for medical officials to help, leaving Guy's corpse behind.

Cast
Judith Light as Janice Mitchell
Jack Wagner as Dr. Ellisman
Ben Masters as Ross Mitchell
Tracey Gold as Sharon Mitchell
Diana Leblanc as Dr. Sachs
Patricia Caroll Brown as Helen Oakes
J.R. Zimmerman as George Oakes
Wendy Hopkins as Sgt. Ryan
Raymond O'Neill as Bob
Sheila Brand as Wendy

DVD
Lady Killer was released to DVD on June 17, 2003 through Live/Artisan studio.

External links
 

1995 television films
1995 films
1995 drama films
CBS network films
American drama television films
Films about rape
Films directed by Steven Schachter
Films scored by Maribeth Solomon
Films scored by Micky Erbe
1990s American films